Hoy was a railway station located northeast of Halkirk, Highland.

The station opened on 28 July 1874  and closed to regular passenger traffic on 29 November 1965.

It was located on the north side of the B874 road on the east side of the village of Halkirk, next to the current railway level crossing. Also at the former station site are military fuel tanks, visible as grass covered mounds, that were built to serve nearby airfields.

The Halkirk Games, first organized in 1886, were held in a nearby field.

Georgemas Junction, which is 2 miles east of Halkirk village, remains open.

References

Notes

Sources 
 

Disused railway stations in Caithness
Railway stations in Great Britain opened in 1874
Railway stations in Great Britain closed in 1965
Former Highland Railway stations
Beeching closures in Scotland